Thomas J. Spota III (born 1941, New York) is a former American attorney and politician, who served as the District Attorney of Suffolk County, New York, serving from 2002 to late 2017, but was disbarred on June 10, 2020. Spota resigned November 10, 2017, after he was indicted on federal charges of obstruction of justice in the investigation of Suffolk County Police Chief James Burke.  Spota was subsequently found guilty and sentenced to five years in federal prison and fined $100,000 .

Early life and education 

Spota was born in 1941 and grew up in New Hyde Park, New York, on Long Island. He graduated from Chaminade High School, a private Catholic school in Mineola, New York. He earned degrees at Fairfield University in Fairfield, Connecticut, and St. John's University School of Law in Jamaica, Queens, New York.

Law career 

After passing the bar, Spota worked as an assistant prosecutor under Suffolk County District Attorney Patrick Henry, during the 1970s and early 1980s. He entered private law practice in Suffolk, representing clients including the Suffolk Detectives Association and other law enforcement unions.

Spota's career ended with his disbarment in 2020 and his sentencing to five years in federal prison in 2021.

Personal 
He lived in Mount Sinai, New York, with his wife. They have three grown children.

District Attorney of Suffolk County 
In 2001 Republican-turned-Democrat Spota ran for District Attorney, and defeated three-time incumbent James M. Catterson Jr in November 2001, taking 58% of the vote. That year in Nassau County, Democrats also were victorious in many positions. He was reelected in 2005, and again in 2009 without any major-party opposition.  
Spota has been active in the fight against the distribution of child pornography over the Internet.  In 2003, Spota indicted twelve Suffolk residents who used KaZaA, a file-sharing program to spread child pornography. Spota was called to testify before the United States Senate Committee on the Judiciary on September 9, 2003, at a hearing concerning "Pornography, Technology, and Process: Problems and Solutions on Peer-to-Peer Networks." Spota recommended a new federal task force and said that legislation was needed to "attack the owners and the distributors of these programs, who are reaping enormous profits."
From December 2010, his office oversaw the investigation of numerous homicides in Suffolk County, believed to have been perpetrated by a single unidentified person, known as the Long Island serial killer, or LISK. The remains of at least ten persons have been found on South Shore beaches, and are believed to be related. The open homicide investigation is still underway.
Among the successful cases prosecuted by his office was the conviction in May 2017 of John Bittrolff, a Manorville carpenter charged with the homicides of prostitutes Rita Tangredi and Colleen McNamee, whose bodies were found on area South Shore beaches in 1993 and 1994, respectively.

Criminal activity
In May 2013 the FBI and the US Attorney's Office opened an investigation into alleged actions by James Burke, Chief of the Suffolk County Police Department: the alleged assault of a suspect in police custody, a subsequent cover-up, and coercion of witnesses. The former chief pleaded guilty to reduced charges in February 2016.

The federal inquiry subsequently expanded beyond Burke to investigate a broader pattern of corruption in both the police department and the office of the Suffolk County district attorney, Thomas J. Spota. In October 2017, Spota and an aide were indicted on charges of obstructing the investigation of James Burke for police brutality. Spota resigned from office on November 10, 2017. He was convicted of obstruction, witness tampering, and conspiracy charges in December 2019  and disbarred in June 2020. Spota's sentencing was delayed multiple times but he was sentenced to 5 years in federal prison and a $100,000 fine on August 10, 2021.

See also 
 List of district attorneys by county

References

External links
Suffolk County District Attorney's office

Living people
Suffolk County district attorneys
Fairfield University alumni
Politicians from Suffolk County, New York
St. John's University School of Law alumni
Chaminade High School alumni
1942 births